The Caffieri family was an Italian family of sculptors active in France in the 17th and 18th centuries.

Descent
Philippe Caffieri (1634–1716), whose children included
Jacques Caffieri (1678–1755), whose children included
Philippe Caffieri (1714–1774)
Jean-Jacques Caffieri (1735–1792)

References

Italian families
do you think that philippe caffieri before his father's death . between year 1745 to 1749 signed his bronzes by stamping his initial CP on his bronzes ?
i have a longcase. dated as shown with a C crown meaning it date  between 1745 and 1749
nearly all bronzes have an initial on the face CP